The 2011–12 season was Real Sociedad's 66th season in La Liga. After managing to stay up in the previous season the Basque club sacked Martín Lasarte and appointed Philippe Montanier as a new coach.

This article shows player statistics and all matches (official and friendly) that the club played during the 2011–12 season.

Season summary

The Season started with the appointment of Philippe Montanier as a coach, and promises from the local media of a new ball-playing approach. 
The new campaign got off to a good start as Real Sociedad won its first game, away to Sporting Gijón. This optimism would not last, as the club found itself bottom of the table by late November. Talk of Montanier's imminent dismissal became overwhelming but two unexpected victories kept the Frenchman in the job. The first, away against Real Betis, was sealed in extra time when Iñigo Martínez shot from midfield, surprising the goalkeeper. This goal became a hit throughout Europe and was nominated as one of the goals of the season. The second victory, against Malaga, was obtained in extra-time too. It is widely accepted that without these two wins Montanier would have been sacked.

Towards the end of 2011 the Basque club stabilized in higher positions and relegation looked unlikely as Sporting Gijon, Racing Santander and Real Zaragoza looked already doomed. On the 36th round Real Sociedad mathematically avoided an unlikely relegation after defeating Racing Santander at home. The club finished in 12th position, with 47 points. Despite the improvement from the previous season and acceptable point tally, criticism of Montanier was widespread. Sections of the media and fans were disappointed in the style of play and Montanier's alleged lack of ambition. During a home game against Real Betis, a number of fans called for Montanier's resignation while the game was in play, and the score was 1–1.

Copa del Rey
In the cup the club met Granada. A home win was enough to knock the Andalusians out, despite being beaten and thoroughly outplayed in the second leg. Similarly, Mallorca were beaten at Anoeta, but a catastrophic second leg sent Real Sociedad out the competition after being defeated 6–1.

Others
Real Sociedad reached an agreement with Nike, who became the official suppliers of the team's kit and training clothing. Thus Real Sociedad ended a 17-year relationship with basque kit providers Astore

Players

Squad information

Start formations
Starting XI
Lineup that started most of the club's competitive matches throughout the season.

The formation above is not the standard lineup during the season. It is unclear whether the team played 4–3–3 or 4–2–3–1. Griezmann and Prieto often switched sides. Carlos Vela played in different attacking positions: wide left, off the striker and as a false nine. Cadamuro-Bentaïba was used as left-back instead of De la Bella as the latter was absent for a long period due to technical decisions and injuries.

The season was marked by the lack of a defined best 11, with constant changes that were not always understood by the local media and fans.

Player stats

Goalkeepers

Transfers 
Martín Lasarte had his contract rescinded by the club almost immediately after the end of the season, being paid €50,000 for it. After some speculation Philippe Montanier was appointed as new coach, for which Valenciennes received €500,000 from Real Sociedad.

Controversially Diego Rivas was not offered a new contract and abandoned the club. Similarly Raul Tamudo left the club after a successful one-year stay. Experienced centre-half Mikel Labaka signed for Rayo Vallecano on a free transfer, ending a 14-year-long relationship with the club. Sutil was let go to Real Murcia after a season spent mostly on the bench.

Young prospects Borja Viguera, Alex Albistegi and Iñigo Sarasola returned to the club at the end of their loan spells. Iosu Esnaola signed for Noja and Sarasola and Albistegi had their contracts rescinded. Albistegi signed for Logroñes later that summer.

Out

Loan out 

Jeffrey Sarpong was loaned to Dutch club NAC Breda in the winter transfer window.

Loan return

Loan in

Loan end 

McDonald Mariga, who had been signed on loan for a season from Inter Milan, returned to Italy during the winter window after a series of disappointing performances for Real Sociedad. Inter Milan loaned the Kenian again, this time to Parma.

Pre-season

League

King's cup

Round of 32

Round of 16

External links
Real Sociedad Fixtures and Results 2011–2012

References

Real Sociedad
Real Sociedad seasons